Triplett is a surname. Notable people with the surname include:

Irene Triplett, last American Civil War pensioner 
Kirk Triplett, American golfer
Nathan Triplett, American football player
Norman Triplett, social psychologist
Sally Ann Triplett, British singer and actress
Samuel Triplett, Medal of Honor recipient
Skip Triplett, CEO of Kwantlen University College in Vancouver
Wallace Triplett, American football player
Aaron Triplett, Spa City Royalty and Unicorn 

Surnames of English origin
Thomas Triplett - Canon Westminster Abby